Matthiola fragrans is a species of flowering plant in the family Brassicaceae, native to Ukraine, south, east and central European Russia, and Kazakhstan. It is confined to chalk outcrops.

References

fragrans
Flora of Ukraine
Flora of Central European Russia
Flora of South European Russia
Flora of East European Russia
Flora of Kazakhstan
Plants described in 1839